Ribchester is a civil parish in Ribble Valley, Lancashire, England. It contains 23 listed buildings that are recorded in the National Heritage List for England.  Of these, one is listed at Grade I, the highest of the three grades, one is at Grade II*, the middle grade, and the others are at Grade II, the lowest grade.  The parish contains the village of Ribchester, and surrounding countryside. Most of the listed buildings are houses and associated structures, or farmhouses and farm buildings, some of which are in the village, and others are in the rural area.  The other listed buildings are two churches, a presbytery, a sundial, a public house with a mounting block outside, a bridge, and almshouses with a wellhead in the grounds.


Key

Buildings

References

Citations

Sources

Listed
Lists of listed buildings in Lancashire
Buildings and structures in Ribble Valley